Khushi Ram (born 15 January 1916) was an Indian gymnast. He competed in seven events at the 1952 Summer Olympics.

References

External links
 

1916 births
Year of death missing
Indian male artistic gymnasts
Olympic gymnasts of India
Gymnasts at the 1952 Summer Olympics